Foodmaster Supermarkets was an Australian supermarket chain that was founded in Canberra in 1983. The supermarkets were located in Downer, O'Connor, Melba, McKellar, Kingston, Red Hill, Wanniassa, Latham, Fraser, Holder, Kambah, Monash and Fisher.

In 1989, one Foodmaster opened in Isaacs.

In 1992, all Foodmaster supermarkets were rebranded as Welcome Mart or Foodtown.

Citations

References

Defunct supermarkets of Australia
Australian companies established in 1983
Food and drink companies established in 1983
Retail companies established in 1983
Retail companies disestablished in 1992
Australian grocers